Dasyboarmia subpilosa is a moth of the family Geometridae. It is found in India (NE Himalaya), Thailand, Peninsular Malaysia, Sumatra, Borneo, Philippines, Sulawesi and Buru.

References

Moths of Asia
Moths described in 1894